Walter Fonseca (born January 16, 1980 in Santa Fe, Argentina) is an Argentine footballer currently playing for Juventud de Pergamino of the Torneo Argentino B in Argentina.

Teams
  Banfield 2000-2003
  Gimnasia y Esgrima de Concepción del Uruguay 2003-2004
  Alvarado de Mar del Plata 2004
  Deportes Temuco 2005
  Estudiantes de Buenos Aires 2005-2007
  El Porvenir 2007-2008
  Cañuelas 2008-2009
  Juventud de Pergamino 2009–present

External links
 

1980 births
Living people
Argentine footballers
Argentine expatriate footballers
Club Atlético Banfield footballers
Cañuelas footballers
Deportes Temuco footballers
Expatriate footballers in Chile
Association footballers not categorized by position
Footballers from Santa Fe, Argentina